The Dress or De jurk is a 1996 Dutch comedy film drama directed by Alex van Warmerdam.

Plot
The Dress is a tale filled with sex, violence, misery, comedy and drama as it follows the life of a dress and parade of lives. Conceived under a cloud of frustration and despair by the dressmaker, the dress becomes a wheel of misfortune in extraordinary sequence of events that envelopes both the dress and those fatefully drawn into its universe. An aloof artist, a school girl, an unfulfilled maid, a borderline train conductor and a broken business executive, all become involuntary players in a macabre game of tag. No one who comes in contact with the dress until it reaches its destination.

Cast
Henri Garcin as Van Tilt
Ingeborg Elzevier as Mrs. Van Tilt
Khaldoun Elmecky as Cremer
Margo Dames as Stewardess
Frans Vorstman as Loohman
Peter Blok	as De Vos
Jacob Derwig as Koerier
Rudolf Lucieer	as De Vet
Maike Meijer as Eva
Carol van Herwijnen as Shopassistent
Rijk de Gooyer	as Martin
Elizabeth Hoytink as Stella
Jack Wouterse as Gardener
Ariane Schluter as Cleaning woman
Kees Hulst	as Overbuurman
Ricky Koole as Chantalle

Reception
On review aggregator Rotten Tomatoes, the film holds an approval rating of 80% based on 10 reviews, with an average rating of 6.90/10.

David Rooney of Variety magazine said that "Dutch director Alex van Warmerdam, spins an eventful narrative out of the story of an inanimate object in his third feature, The Dress. Charting the effect the titular garment has on a string of men and women, the director does a mechanically impressive job of sustaining what feels like an exercise in narrative construction".

See also
List of films featuring home invasions

References

External links

1996 comedy films
Dutch comedy films
1990s Dutch-language films
Films directed by Alex van Warmerdam